Leslie Giles (2 January 1906 – 1 June 1981) was a New Zealand sportsman. He played one first-class match for Otago in 1929/30.

Giles was born at Christchurch in 1906. He was educated at Otago Boys' High School in Dunedin and later worked in the railway industry. As wells cricket, he played rugby union for Otago. Following his death in 1981, obituaries were published in the New Zealand Cricket Annual and in the following year's Wisden.

References

External links
 

1906 births
1981 deaths
New Zealand cricketers
Otago cricketers
Cricketers from Christchurch